The Battle of the Philippine Sea was fought 19–20 June 1944 in the waters west of the Mariana Islands by elements of the Imperial Japanese Navy's Combined Fleet and of the United States Navy's Pacific Fleet. The battle resulted from the Japanese reaction to the American invasion of the island of Saipan. Instead of attacking the troop transports off Saipan, Admiral Toyoda chose to engage the American carrier forces in what he intended to be the long-awaited “decisive battle” that would crush U.S. naval power.

The outcome was a disaster for the Japanese Navy. The battle exacted a terrible toll from the Japanese naval air arm, costing them most of their few remaining experienced pilots. The Combined Fleet was no longer capable of serious offensive operations after this engagement. Historian Samuel Eliot Morison characterized it this way:

This was the greatest carrier battle of the war. The forces engaged were three to four times those in preceding actions like Midway, and victory was so complete that the Japanese could never again engage on such a scale. ... above all the skill, initiative, and intrepid courage of the young aviators made this day one of the high points in the history of the American spirit.

Since the Japanese assumed the tactical offensive, their forces are listed first.

Forces deployed
Losses in parentheses

Japanese order of battle

Mobile Fleet
Vice Admiral Jisaburō Ozawa in Taihō

"A" Force

Sortied 13 June from Tawi Tawi anchorage off NE Borneo
Vice Admiral Ozawa
 Carrier Division 1 (Vice Adm. Ozawa)
 3 fleet carriers
 
 
  
 Air Unit
 79 Mitsubishi A6M "Zeke" fighters
 70 Yokosuka D4Y "Judy" dive bombers
   7 Aichi D3A "Val" dive bombers
 51 Nakajima B6N "Jill" torpedo bombers
 Cruiser Division 5 (Rear Adm. Shintaro Hashimoto)
 2 heavy cruisers: , 
 Screen (Rear Adm. Susumu Kimura in Yahagi)
 1 light cruiser: 
 9 destroyers
 1 Asashio-class (6 × 5 in. main battery): 
 1 Mutsuki-class (4 × 4.7 in. main battery): 

"B" Force

Sortied 13 June from Tawi Tawi anchorage off NE Borneo
Rear Admiral Takaji Joshima
 Carrier Division 2 (Rear Admiral Joshima)
 2 converted carriers
 
 
 1 light carrier
 
 Air Unit
 81 Mitsubishi A6M "Zeke" fighters
 27 Yokosuka D4Y "Judy" dive bombers
   9 Aichi D3A "Val" dive bombers
 18 Nakajima B6N "Jill" torpedo bombers
 1 old battleship: 
 1 heavy cruiser: 
 Screen
 10 destroyers
 2 Asashio-class (6 × 5 in. main battery): , 
 2 Kagerō-class (6 × 5 in. main battery): , 
 2 Yūgumo-class (6 × 5 in. main battery): , 
 4 Shiratsuyu-class (5 × 5 in. main battery): , 

Van Force

Sortied 12 June from Batjan anchorage off SW Halmahera Island
Vice Admiral Takeo Kurita in heavy cruiser Atago
 Carrier Division 3 (Rear Adm. Sueo Obayashi)
 3 light carriers
 
 
 
 Air Unit
 62 Mitsubishi A6M "Zeke" fighters
 17 Nakajima B5N "Kate" torpedo bombers
   9 Nakajima B6N "Jill" torpedo bombers
 Battleship Division 1 (Vice Adm. Matome Ugaki)
 2 super battleships: , 
 Battleship Division 3 (Vice Adm. Yoshio Suzuki)
 2 old battleships: , 
 Cruiser Division 4 (Vice Adm. Kurita)
 Screen (Rear Adm.l Mikio Hayakawa in Noshiro)
 1 light cruiser: 
 1 super destroyer (41 knots, 15 torpedo tubes): 
 8 destroyers:
 1 Kagerō-class (6 × 5 in. main battery):

Supply Forces

Sortied with Ozawa's carrier forces 13 June from Tawi Tawi anchorage off NE Borneo
 1st Supply Force
 4 oilers
 Hayasui, Nichiei Maru, Kokuyo Maru, Seiyo Maru
 4 destroyers
 1  (6 × 5 in. main battery): 
 1  (5 × 5 in. main battery): 
 1  (4 × 4.7 in. main battery): 
 1  (3 × 4.7 in. main battery): 
 2nd Supply Force
 2 oilers
  Genyo Maru, Azusa Maru
 2 destroyers
 1 Kagerō-class (6 × 5 in. main battery): 
 1 Mutsuki-class (4 × 4.7 in. main battery):

Submarine Forces
Vice Admiral Takeo Takagi at Saipan
 7 1st-class submarines
 Deployed in two parallel rows SW to NE north of the Admiralties and Bismarcks
 17 2nd-class submarines

American order of battle

US Fifth Fleet
Admiral Raymond A. Spruance in heavy cruiser 

Task Force 58 – Fast Carrier Forces
Vice Admiral Marc A. Mitscher in fleet carrier

Task Group 58.1 

 Carrier Division 13
 Rear Admiral Joseph J. Clark
 2 fleet carriers
   (Capt. William D. Sample)
  Air Group 2 (Cmdr. Jackson D. Arnold)
 36 F6F Hellcat fighters (Lt. Cmdr. W.A. Dean)
 33 SB2C Helldiver dive bombers (Lt. Cmdr. G.B. Campbell)
   4 TBF Avenger, 14 TBM Avenger torpedo bombers (Lt. Cmdr. L.M.D. Ford)
   4 F6F-xN Hellcat night fighters  (Lt. R.L. Reiserer)
  (Capt. Ralph E. Jennings)
 Air Group 1 (Cmdr. J.M. Peters)
 41 F6F Hellcat fighters (Lt. Cmdr. B.M. Strean)
 40 SB2C Helldiver, 4 SBD-5 Dauntless dive bombers (Lt. Cmdr. J.W. Runyan, USNR)
   1 TBF Avenger, 16 TBM Avenger torpedo bombers (Lt. Cmdr. W.F. Henry)
   4 F6F-xN Hellcat night fighters  (Lt. A.C. Benjes)
 2 light carriers
  (Capt. John Perry)
 Air Group 24 (Cmdr. E.M. Link)
 26 F6F Hellcat fighters (Lt. Cmdr. Link)
   3 TBF Avenger, 6 TBM Avenger torpedo bombers (Lt. R.M. Swensson)
  (Capt. Valentine H. Schaeffer)
 Air Group 50 (Lt. Cmdr. J.C. Strange, USNR)
 24 F6F Hellcat fighters (Lt. Cmdr. Strange)
   9 TBM Avenger torpedo bombers (Lt. Cmdr. L.V. Swanson)
 Cruiser Division 10 (Rear Admiral Leo H. Thebaud)
 3 heavy cruisers
  (Capt. W.C. Calhoun) 
  (Capt. E.E. Herrmann) 
  (Capt. A.R. Early)
 Screen
 2 anti-aircraft light cruisers (Rear Admiral Thebaud)
  (Capt. Guy W. Clark)
  (Capt. William K. Phillips)
 14 destroyers (Capt. Clark)
 1 Bagley-class (4 × 5 in. main battery):

Task Group 58.2 

 Carrier Division 3
 Rear Admiral Alfred E. Montgomery
 2 fleet carriers
  (Capt. T.P. Jeter)
 Air Group 8 (Cmdr. R.L. Shifley)
 37 F6F Hellcat fighters (Lt. Cmdr. W.M. Collins)
 33 SB2C Helldiver dive bombers (Lt. Cmdr. J.D. Arbes)
 13 TBF Avenger, 5 TBM Avenger torpedo bombers (Lt. Cmdr. K.F. Musick)
   4 F6F-xN Hellcat night fighters  (Lt. Cmdr. E.P. Aurand)
  (Capt. Clifton Sprague)
 Air Group 14 (Cmdr. W.C. Wingard)
 34 F6F Hellcat fighters (Lt. Cmdr. E.W. Biros, USNR)
 32 SB2C Helldiver dive bombers (Lt. Cmdr. J.D. Blitch)
 18 TBF Avenger torpedo bombers (Lt. Cmdr. H.S. Roberts, USNR)
   4 F6F-xN Hellcat night fighters  (Lt. J.H. Boyum)
 2 light carriers
  (Capt. S.J. Michael)
 Air Group 31 (Lt. Cmdr. R.A. Winston)
 24 F6F Hellcat fighters (Lt. Cmdr. Winston)
   1 TBF Avenger, 8 TBM Avenger torpedo bombers (Lt. E.E. Wood, USNR)
  (Capt. Stuart H. Ingersoll)
 Air Group 28 (Lt. Cmdr. R.W. Mehle, USNR)
 21 F6F Hellcat fighters (Lt. Cmdr. Mehle)
   8 TBF Avenger torpedo bombers (Lt. Cmdr. R.P. Gift, USNR)
 1 heavy cruiser
  (Capt. Harry Slocum)
 Cruiser Division 13 (Rear Admiral Laurance T. DuBose)
 3 light cruisers
  (Capt. Jerauld Wright)
  (Capt. Charles J. Wheeler)
  (Capt. Daniel M. McGurl)
 Screen
 12 destroyers

Task Group 58.3 

 Carrier Division 2
 Rear Admiral John W. Reeves
 2 fleet carriers
  (Capt. Matthias B. Gardner)
 Air Group 10 (Cmdr. W.R. Kane)
 31 F6F Hellcat fighters (Lt. R.W. Schumann)
 21 SBD Dauntless dive bombers (Lt. Cmdr. James D. Ramage)
   9 TBF Avenger, 5 TBM Avenger torpedo bombers (Lt. Cmdr. W.I. Martin)
   3 F4U Corsair night fighters (Lt. Cmdr. R.E. Harmer)
  (Capt. E.W. Litch)
 Air Group 16 (Cmdr. E.M. Snowden)
 37 F6F Hellcat fighters (Lt. Cmdr. Ralph Weymouth)
 34 SBD Dauntless dive bombers (Lt. Cmdr. Weymouth)
 17 TBF Avenger, 1 TBM Avenger torpedo bombers (Lt. Cmdr. N.A. Sterrie, USNR)
   4 F6F-xN Hellcat fighters (Lt. W.H. Abercrombie, USNR)
 2 light carriers
  (Capt. Harold M. Martin)
 Air Group 51 (Lt. Cmdr. C.L. Moore)
 24 F6F Hellcat fighters (Lt. Cmdr. Moore)
   6 TBF Avenger, 2 TBM Avenger torpedo bombers (Lt. Cmdr. D.J. Melvin)
  (Capt. W.H. Buracker)
 Air Group 27 (Lt. Cmdr. E.W. Wood – KIA)
 24 F6F Hellcat fighters (Lt. Cmdr. Wood)
   9 TBM Avenger torpedo bombers (Lt. Cmdr. S.M. Haley, USNR)
 1 heavy cruiser
  (Capt. E.R. Johnson)
 Cruiser Division 12 (Rear Admiral Robert W. Hayler)
 3 light cruisers
  (Capt. H.D. Hoffman)
  (Capt. A.G. Shepard)
  (Capt. Thomas B. Inglis)
 Screen
 1 anti-aircraft light cruiser
  (Capt. R.C. Alexander)
 16 destroyers

Task Group 58.4 

 Carrier Division 12
 Rear Admiral William K. Harrill
 1 fleet carrier
  (Capt. Ralph A. Ofstie)
 Air Group 15 (Cmdr. David McCampbell)
 38 F6F Hellcat fighters (Lt. Cmdr. C.W. Brewer -- KIA)
 36 SB2C Helldiver dive bombers (Lt. Cmdr. J.H. Mini)
 15 TBF Avenger, 5 TBM Avenger torpedo bombers (Lt. Cmdr. V.G. Lambert)
   4 F6F-xN Hellcat night fighters  (Lt. R.M. Freeman)
 2 light carriers
  (Capt. W.M. Dillon)
 Air Group 32 (Lt. Cmdr. E.C. Outlaw)
 23 F6F Hellcat fighters (Lt. Cmdr. Outlaw)
   7 TBF Avenger, 2 TBM Avenger torpedo bombers (Lt. D.A. Marks)
  (Capt. H.W. Taylor)
 Air Group 25 (Lt. Cmdr. R.H. Price)
 23 F6F Hellcat fighters (Lt. Cmdr. Price)
   3 TBF Avenger, 6 TBM Avenger torpedo bombers (Lt. R.B. Cottingham, USNR)
 Cruiser Division 14 (Rear admiral Wilder D. Baker)
 3 light cruisers
  (Capt. A.D. Brown)
  (Capt. W.W. Behrens)
  (Capt. J.G. Crawford)
 Screen
 1 anti-aircraft light cruiser
  (Capt. L.J. Hudson)
 14 destroyers
 1 Mahan-class (5 × 5 in. main battery): 

Task Group 58.7 

Commander, Battleships, Pacific Fleet
 Vice Admiral Willis Augustus Lee
 Battleship Division 6 (Vice Admiral Lee)
 2  
  (Capt. Frank P. Thomas)
  (Capt. Thomas R. Cooley)
 Battleship Division 7 (Rear Admiral Olaf M. Hustvedt)
 2 
  (Capt. John L. McCrea)
  (Capt. Carl F. Holden)
 Battleship Division 8 (Rear Admiral Glenn B. Davis)
 1  
  (Capt. Thomas J. Keliher Jr.) 
 Battleship Division 9 (Rear Admiral Edward Hanson)
 2  
  (Capt. Ralph S. Riggs)
  (Capt. Fred D. Kirtland)
 Cruiser Division 6 (Rear Admiral C. Turner Joy)
 3 heavy cruisers
  (Capt. J.J. Mahoney)
  (Capt. J.E. Hurff)
  (Capt. Harvey Overesch)
 Screen
 14 destroyers
 1 Porter-class (8 × 5 in. main battery): 
 1 Mahan-class (5 × 5 in. main battery):

Seventh Fleet Submarines 

Rear Admiral Ralph W. Christie (HQ at Fremantle)
 Southeast of Mindanao
 3 Gato-class (10 tubes: 6 forward, 4 aft): Hake, Bashaw, Paddle
 IJN anchorage at Tawi Tawi
 3 Gato-class (10 tubes: 6 forward, 4 aft): Harder, Haddo, Redfin
 Off Luzon
 2 Gato-class (10 tubes: 6 forward, 4 aft): Bluefish, Jack, Flier

Task Force 17 

Patrol Submarines
Vice Admiral Charles A. Lockwood (HQ at Pearl Harbor)
 At the Bonins
 2 Balao-class (10 tubes: 6 forward, 4 aft): Archerfish, Plaice
 1 Gar-class (10 tubes: 6 forward, 4 aft): Gar
 1 Sargo-class (8 tubes: 4 forward, 4 aft): Swordfish
 1 Porpoise-class (6 tubes: 4 forward, 2 aft): Plunger
 Southeast of Formosa and eastward
 2 Balao-class (10 tubes: 6 forward, 4 aft): Pintado, Pilotfish
 1 Gato-class (10 tubes: 6 forward, 4 aft): Tunny
 East and Southeast of the Marianas 
 2 Gato-class (10 tubes: 6 forward, 4 aft): Albacore, Finback
 1 Balao-class (10 tubes: 6 forward, 4 aft): Bang
 1 Salmon-class (8 tubes: 4 forward, 4 aft): Stingray
 1 Sargo-class (8 tubes: 4 forward, 4 aft): Seawolf
 Ulithi and the Philippines
 3 Gato-class (10 tubes: 6 forward, 4 aft): Flying Fish, Muskallunge, Cavalla
 2 Balao-class (10 tubes: 6 forward, 4 aft): Seahorse, Pipefish
 Off Surigao Strait
 1 Gato-class (10 tubes: 6 forward, 4 aft): Growler

Notes

References

Bibliography

 
 
 
 

World War II orders of battle